The 2004 National Lacrosse League season is the 18th season in the NLL that began on December 26, 2003, with the Arizona Sting hosting the Vancouver Ravens.  That game was the Sting's first-ever game and the first event held in the new Glendale Arena (now Gila River Arena) in Glendale, Arizona.  The season concluded with the championship game on May 7, 2004. Over 19,000 fans, the second largest crowd ever at an NLL game, packed the Pengrowth Saddledome (now Scotiabank Saddledome) to watch the Calgary Roughnecks defeat the Buffalo Bandits 14–11. This game was the first NLL championship game since 1998 that did not feature the Toronto Rock.

The collective bargaining agreement (CBA) between the league and the Professional Lacrosse Players' Association expired before the 2004 season, and the lack of a new agreement caused a 12-day players strike in December 2003. On December 17, the NLL and PLPA announced that the previous CBA had been extended by one year, guaranteeing that the 2004 season would be played without strikes or lockouts.

Team movement
2004 was a season of turmoil for the NLL – two franchises disappeared while three others moved cross-country, causing a division realignment. Gone was the three-division format that had been used in the preceding two seasons; the league was now split into East and West divisions. The Ottawa Rebel and New York Saints franchises both folded, and the following teams moved:
 the Columbus Landsharks moved to Glendale, Arizona, becoming the Arizona Sting
 the New Jersey Storm moved to Anaheim, California, becoming the Anaheim Storm
 the Albany Attack moved to San Jose, California, becoming the San Jose Stealth

These three joined Colorado, Calgary, and Vancouver in the West division, while perennial rivals Toronto, Buffalo, Rochester, and Philadelphia were left to fight over three playoff spots in the East.

Milestones
January 9: The Anaheim Storm play their first ever home game, losing to the Arizona Sting 19–18 in the first triple overtime game in NLL history. Mark Shepherd scored the teams first regulation goal.  This is a record not likely to ever be broken – before the 2005 season, the NLL changed overtime periods to 15 minutes from five. Since then, no games have even seen double overtime.

Final standings

Regular season

Playoffs

All Star Game
The 2004 All-Star Game was held at Pepsi Center in Denver on February 22, 2004. The East division defeated the West 19–15, and Buffalo's Mark Steenhuis was named game MVP.

All-Star teams

Awards

Weekly awards
The NLL gives out awards weekly for the best overall player, best offensive player, best defensive player, and best rookie.

Monthly awards 
Awards are also given out monthly for the best overall player and best rookie.

Statistics leaders
Bold numbers indicate new single-season records. Italics indicate tied single-season records.

See also 
 2004 in sports

References

External links
2004 Archive at the Outsider's Guide to the NLL

04
National Lacrosse League